Scott MacGillivray (born June 29, 1957) is an American non-fiction author specializing in motion picture history.

His book Laurel & Hardy: From the Forties Forward, revised and expanded in 2009, chronicles the later films of Stan Laurel and Oliver Hardy. Some of his other books are The Soundies Book: A Revised and Expanded Guide (2007, co-authored with Ted Okuda), Gloria Jean: A Little Bit of Heaven (2005, co-authored with Jan MacGillivray), and Castle Films: A Hobbyist's Guide (2004, foreword by Okuda).

MacGillivray has been the chairman of the Boston chapter of the international Laurel and Hardy society The Sons of the Desert since 1977, and is the longest-tenured chairman in the organization.  His commentaries appear on 20th Century-Fox's DVD set The Laurel and Hardy Collection, Volume 2.

External links
Boston Brats website

References 

1957 births
Living people
American non-fiction writers